Grande Motte is a mountain of Savoie, France. It lies in the Massif de la Vanoise range. It has an elevation of 3,653 metres above sea level.

One side of it is in the Tignes ski area. There is a cable car up to 3453 m.

Alpine three-thousanders
Mountains of the Graian Alps
Mountains of Savoie